Guan Xiaotong (born 17 September 1997) is a Chinese actress and singer of Manchu descent. She is known for her roles in films The Left Ear and Shadow; and the television series To Be a Better Man. From an early age, her family encouraged a passion for the arts, and she first starred in Nuan at the age of four. Forbes China listed Guan under their Asia 2017 list which consisted of 30 influential people under 30 years old who have had a substantial effect in their fields.

Known as the "Nation's Daughter" in China, Guan is regarded as one of the "Four Dan Actresses of the post-90s Generation" and as one of the "New Four Dan actresses of the "post-'95s" Generation" by CCTV.

Biography
Guan was born to a family of actors in Beijing. Her father, Guan Shaozeng, was an actor, and her grandfather, Guan Xuezeng was the founder of Beijing Qinshu. From an early age, her family encouraged a passion for the arts, and she first starred in Nuan at the age of four.

In 2016, Guan was admitted into the Beijing Film Academy after placing first in both the practical and written section of the Chinese College Entrance Examinations.

Career
Guan first gained attention when she starred in Nuan, adapted from author Mo Yan's short story, The White Dog and the Swing. The film garnered positive reception from both China and Japan.

Guan rose to prominence as a child actress through Chen Kaige's film The Promise, playing the younger counterpart of Cecilia Cheung's character. She continued to build up her filmography, starring in television series and films.

Her popularity rose as she starred in the 2014 television series May December Love, which received high ratings in China. She also starred in One Servant of Two Masters, which won her the Best Supporting Actress award at the Hengdian Film and TV Festival of China. Following the airing of these dramas, Guan was dubbed as the "Nation's Daughter" by the Chinese media.

In 2015, Guan starred in coming-of-age film The Left Ear, and won the Most Promising Actress award at the inaugural Gold Aries Award held by Macau International Movie Festival. The same year, she also released her first solo album, Eighteen.

In 2016, Guan starred in the family drama Papa Can You Hear Me Sing, a remake of the classic Taiwanese film of the same name.
She then starred in the romance drama  To Be A Better Man. Both series earned high ratings in China, and Guan won the Best Supporting Actress award at the Shanghai Television Festival for her performance in To Be a Better Man. She also starred in her first adult leading role in the fantasy drama Novoland: Castle in the Sky, and won the Best Actress award at the 7th Macau International Television Festival for her performance.

In 2017, Guan played the female lead in fantasy action drama Xuan-Yuan Sword: Han Cloud and romance comedy series Love of Aurora. 

In 2018, Guan starred in the historical romance drama Untouchable Lovers as well as sports romantic comedy series Sweet Combat. The same year, Guan starred in Zhang Yimou's wuxia film Shadow, receiving positive reviews for her portrayal of a double-faced princess. 
The same year, she was cast in the fantasy romance film The Story of Turandot alongside Dylan Sprouse. Forbes China listed Guan under their 30 Under 30 Asia 2017 list which consisted of 30 influential people under 30 years old who have had a substantial effect in their fields.

In 2020, Guan starred in the female-centric youth modern drama Twenty Your Life On. 
The same year, she starred in the romance comedy film Oversize Love.

Social activities
In 2017, Guan became the ambassador for "World Life Day", a joint campaign by the United Nations Environment Programme, International Fund for Animal Welfare and The Nature Conservancy.

Personal life
On October 8 2017, Guan and Chinese actor-singer Lu Han, her co-star in Sweet Combat admitted that they were dating

Filmography

Film

Television Series

Discography

Albums

Singles

Soundtracks

Other appearances

Bibliography

Awards and nominations

Forbes China Celebrity 100

References

External links

 
 

1997 births
Living people
21st-century Chinese actresses
Chinese television actresses
Chinese film actresses
Chinese child actresses
Actresses from Beijing
Manchu actresses
Beijing Film Academy alumni
The Amazing Race contestants
Manchu singers